The Polite Force is the second album by British band Egg, released in February  1971.

Track listing

The tracks all appear separately with spaces in between them on both the long playing record and the Compact Disc. On the original long playing record from Deram, "Long Piece No. 3" is listed with the four parts. A time of 20:42 is given as the overall length of the piece, with separate incremental lengths of time given for each of the parts. The reference to the side number and tracks therein is the same as the vinyl album. In turn, the compact disc has 7 tracks.

Personnel
 Dave Stewart - organ, piano, tone generator, orchestron
 Mont Campbell - bass, vocals (1, 2); piano and organ on "Long Piece No. 3 - Part 1"; french horn on "Long Piece No. 3 - Part 2"
 Clive Brooks – drums

Guests
 Henry Lowther - trumpet on "Contrasong"
 Mike Davis - trumpet on "Contrasong"
 Bob Downes - tenor saxophone on "Contrasong"
 Tony Roberts - tenor saxophone on "Contrasong"

References

External links
Lyrics to The Polite Force

Egg albums
1971 albums
Deram Records albums